Filindeu (Sardinian: su filindeu, "Thread of God") is a rare pasta from the Barbagia region of Sardinia. It is made by pulling and folding semolina dough into very thin threads, which are laid in three layers on a tray called a fundu and dried to form textile-like sheets. The dried sheets are broken into pieces and served in a mutton broth with pecorino cheese. Filindeu is listed on the Ark of Taste.

History 
For centuries, during the nights of May 1st and October 4th, the rural sanctuary of Francis of Assisi from Lula, built where, in the 17th century, a Nuorese bandit had built a small church as an ex voto for having been cleared of the charges, has been reached by the faithful who set out on foot from the church of the Rosario in Nuoro. Upon arrival, after a walk of several kilometers, the priors offer the pilgrims a hearty dish of soup.

The preparation of pasta for the soup, made exclusively by hand, is handed down by women from generation to generation and in modern times there are few, ten in all, the ladies who keep the once more widespread tradition.

References

Cuisine of Sardinia
Types of pasta
Ark of Taste foods